Bembina apicalis is a moth of the family Erebidae first described by Francis Walker in 1865. It is found in India and Sri Lanka.

The caterpillar is known to feed on Terminalia species.

References

Moths of Asia
Moths described in 1865